The first season of the television series Jonas was aired on Disney Channel from May 2, 2009, to March 14, 2010, and included 21 episodes. It introduces the six main characters of the series and follows the Jonas Brothers as they live pop star lives and deal with ordinary teenage problems.

The season's soundtrack was never officially released. The season itself was released on DVD in two volumes: "JONAS: Rockin' The House", released on September 22, 2009, and "I Heart JONAS", released on January 26, 2010, both by Disney DVD. Three volumes making up the entire first season of JONAS were released on Region 2 DVD in the United Kingdom and Region 4 in Australia. The three new titles being: "Rockstars In the House", "Ready To Rock" and "Keeping It Real".

Production
This season was set in New Jersey, before the setting changed to Los Angeles for the second season and was shot at Hollywood Center Studios, which has also been the home to several other Disney Channel sitcoms over the years including The Suite Life on Deck and Wizards of Waverly Place. This is the first original series on the channel to be broadcast in high definition since its first season.

Opening sequence
The theme song for JONAS is "Live to Party", performed by the Jonas Brothers (as JONAS). The song's lyrics describe the basic premise of the television series – the Jonas' lifestyle.

The full-length version, which is 2 minutes, 55 seconds in length, was included on Disney Channel Playlist, the video game "JONAS" and a UK bonus track for the band's third album, A Little Bit Longer. For the TV version of the theme, which lasts only 50 seconds, only the first two stanzas and the last two were used.

The opening sequence shows the main cast members as the Jonas perform a song, with the creator's names appearing in the second-to-last part. The show's title logo design appears at the end of the sequence.

Casting
Nicole Anderson also auditioned for the role of Stella, but actress Chelsea Staub ended up winning the part. According to Staub, her previous work with director Sean McNamara helped her land the role. After the series plot changed, producers decided to create a best friend for Stella and offered Anderson, Staub's real life best friend, the role of Macy.

JONAS was intended to star Kevin, Nick, and Joe Jonas, who lend their first names to their television counterparts. The role of Frankie Lucas was also created with Frankie Jonas in mind. In addition, Robert "Big Rob" Feggans, the Jonas Brothers real-life head of security, plays The Big Man, the JONAS bodyguard.

Episodes

References

External links
 

2009 American television seasons
2010 American television seasons